Tila sequanda is a moth in the family Gelechiidae. It was described by Povolny in 1974. It is found in the Asia Minor.

The length of the forewings is 4–5 mm. The forewings are mostly covered with brownish scales, with many or some of these black-tipped. There are three dots. The hindwings are light greyish, darker at the costa.

References

Gnorimoschemini
Moths described in 1974